Colin Hutchinson (20 October 1936 – 20 January 2017) was an English footballer who played in the Football League for Stoke City.

Career
Hutchinson was born in Consett and played for Crook Hall before signing for Football League side Stoke City after a successful trial. He struggled to break into Frank Taylor's first team and in four seasons he managed to make just nine appearances. He joined Stafford Rangers and had an unsuccessful spell with Crewe Alexandra. He managed Stafford Rangers between 1965 and 1969, before taking charge of Nantwich Town(1973–1979) and Droylsden (1979–1981).

Career statistics

References

1936 births
2017 deaths
Sportspeople from Consett
Footballers from County Durham
English footballers
Association football wingers
Stoke City F.C. players
Stafford Rangers F.C. players
Crewe Alexandra F.C. players
Macclesfield Town F.C. players
English Football League players
English football managers
Stafford Rangers F.C. managers
Nantwich Town F.C. managers
Droylsden F.C. managers